"After Party" is a song by American rapper and singer Don Toliver, released on June 23, 2020, by Cactus Jack Records, Atlantic Records and We Run It Entertainment, as the fourth single from his debut studio album, Heaven or Hell (2020).

The song grew in popularity on sites like TikTok due to users making memes with the song set to capybaras.

Promotion
The song was previewed on Travis Scott's Netflix documentary Look Mom I Can Fly. It originally featured a verse from Scott, which didn't make it to the final version. He later performed a portion of the song at the 2019 Astroworld Festival.

Credits and personnel
Credits adapted from Tidal.
 Caleb Toliver – vocals, songwriting, composition
 Jacques Webster II – songwriting, composition, additional production
 Zach Steele – recording
 Sonny Unaezuoke – songwriting, composition, production
 Kevin Gomringer – songwriting, composition, production
 Tim Gomringer – songwriting, composition, production
 Nils Noehden – songwriting, composition, production
 Mike Dean – songwriting, composition, co-production, mastering, mixing
 Jimmy Cash – mixing assistance
 Sage Skolfield – mixing assistance
 Sean Solymar – mixing assistance

Charts

Weekly charts

Year-end charts

Certifications

References

External links
 

2020 singles
2020 songs
Don Toliver songs
Atlantic Records singles
Songs written by Don Toliver
Songs written by Mike Dean (record producer)
Songs written by Sonny Digital
Songs written by Travis Scott
Internet memes introduced in 2022
Songs written by Kevin Gomringer
Songs written by Tim Gomringer
Song recordings produced by Travis Scott
Song recordings produced by Mike Dean (record producer)
Song recordings produced by Cubeatz